The 2001 St. George Illawarra Dragons season was the third in the joint venture club's history. The Dragons competed in the NRL's 2001 premiership season. The team finished seventh in the regular season, making finals but getting knocked out in the second week against the Brisbane Broncos, losing 44–28.

Squad gains and losses

Ladder

Ladder progression

Season results

References 

St. George Illawarra Dragons
St. George Illawarra Dragons seasons
2001 in rugby league by club